The Sellers Farm was a historic farmstead in Maysville, Arkansas.  The main house was a two-story I-house, with a rear wing giving it an overall T configuration.  The main facade faced west, and was covered by a porch that extended the full width on the first floor, and for three of the five bays on the second.  There was a front-facing gable above the three center bays.  Built c. 1910, it was an example of a little-altered I-house.  Outbuildings on the property included a feed barn, chicken house, milk shed, and privy.  All of the buildings on the property were in Arkansas; the associated land extended into neighboring Oklahoma.

The property was listed on the National Register of Historic Places in 1988, at which time most of its outbuildings were described as being fair-to-poor condition, with the house in good condition, but the house and most, if not all, of the out buildings have since been destroyed.

See also
National Register of Historic Places listings in Benton County, Arkansas

References

Houses on the National Register of Historic Places in Arkansas
Houses completed in 1910
Houses in Benton County, Arkansas
Farms on the National Register of Historic Places in Arkansas
National Register of Historic Places in Benton County, Arkansas
I-houses in Arkansas
Demolished buildings and structures in Arkansas